KRAD-LP (94.9 FM, "94.9 KRAD") is a low-power radio station broadcasting a Christian music format. Licensed to Millersburg, Oregon, United States, the station is currently owned by Transformation International, Inc.

References

External links
 

RAD-LP
RAD-LP
Linn County, Oregon